Lottia cassis is a species of sea snail, a true limpet, a marine gastropod mollusk in the family Lottiidae, one of the families of true limpets.

Description

Distribution
It can be found in the Pacific Northwest in the Okhotsk Sea and off of Japan and Eastern Russia.

References

Lottiidae
Gastropods described in 1833
Taxa named by Johann Friedrich von Eschscholtz